The 1981 UCF Knights football season represented the University of Central Florida (UCF) as an independent during the 1981 NCAA Division III football season. Led by Don Jonas in this third and final season as head coach, the Knights compiled a record of 4–6. UCF played their home games at Orlando Stadium in downtown Orlando, Florida. This was the final season that team competed at the NCAA Division III level as they moved to  NCAA Division II competition in 1982.

Schedule

References

UCF
UCF Knights football seasons
UCF Knights football